Gidea Park Sports Ground is a cricket ground in Gidea Park, Romford, England. The first recorded match on the ground was in 1948, when the Essex Second XI played the Sussex Second XI in the Minor Counties Championship.

Essex played their first first-class match there in 1950, when they played Hampshire.  From 1950 to 1968 the ground played host to 34 first-class matches, the last of which saw Essex play Surrey.

In local domestic cricket, the ground is the home venue of Gidea Park and Romford Cricket Club who play in the Essex Premier League.

References

External links
Gidea Park Sports Ground on CricketArchive
Gidea Park Sports Ground on Cricinfo

Cricket grounds in Essex
Cricket grounds in London
Buildings and structures in the London Borough of Havering
Sport in the London Borough of Havering
Sports venues completed in 1948
Essex County Cricket Club
1948 establishments in England